The Bijelo Brdo culture or Bjelo-Brdo culture is an early medieval archaeological culture flourishing in the 10th and 11th centuries in Central Europe. It represents a synthesis of the culture introduced in the Carpathian Basin by the conquering Hungarians around 900 and of earlier cultures existing in the territory (in present-day Croatia, Hungary, Romania, Serbia and Slovakia) before the Hungarian conquest. Female dress accessories, including "jewellery of plaited wire, two-piece sheetwork pendants, snake-head bracelets and S-shaped temple-reings" (P. M. Barford), are the most characteristic items of the culture. The culture disappeared around 1100, most probably not independently of laws adopted under Kings Ladislaus I and Coloman of Hungary which prescribed the burial of dead in graveyards developed near churches.

Initially it was thought that the poorer Hungarian(Magyar) gravesites were Slavic and that only the rich horse-warrior burials were Hungarian. This view was challenged in the 1940s and is now rejected by Hungarian scholars, who see the poorer burials as Magyar commoners, such as Béla Szőke.

It is named after an archeological site, a medieval graveyard found near the village of Bijelo Brdo, Croatia and excavated since 1895. The dating at 7th Century of Site 1 was established by Zdenko Vinski.

According to the Russian archaeologist Valentin Vasilyevich Sedov, the basic territory of Bijelo Brdo culture included territory of present-day Hungary, southern Slovakia and part of Serbian Vojvodina.

See also
History of Christianity in Hungary
History of Christianity in Romania
History of Christianity in Slovakia
Hungarian conquest of the Carpathian Basin

Footnotes

References

Barford, P. M. (2001). The Early Slavs: Culture and Society in Early Medieval Eastern Europe. Cornell University Press. .
Curta, Florin (2006). Southeastern Europe in the Middle Ages, 500-1250. Cambridge University Press. .
Engel, Pál (2001). The Realm of St Stephen: A History of Medieval Hungary, 895-1526. I.B. Tauris Publishers. .
Spinei, Victor (2003). The Great Migrations in the East and South East of Europe from the Ninth to the Thirteenth Century (Translated by Dana Bădulescu). .
 

Early medieval archaeological cultures of Europe
Slavic archaeological cultures
Archaeological cultures of Central Europe
Archaeological cultures in Croatia
Archaeological cultures in Hungary
Archaeological cultures in Romania
Archaeological cultures in Serbia
Archaeological cultures in Slovakia
Archaeological cultures in Ukraine